Theo Kellner (13 April 1899 – 26 February 1969) was a German artist and architect active in Berlin, Erfurt and Frankfurt.

After the end of the Second World War, Kellner was involved with the reconstruction of several buildings in Frankfurt, such as the Goethe House and the Church of St Peter, Frankfurt.

Biography 
Kellner was a student of artist Lyonel Feininger and architect Hans Poelzig. From 1926 to 1931 he worked in the company Atelier für Architektur in Berlin; from 1932 he worked in Erfurt, East Germany. During the Nazi regime, Kellner was mostly active in heritage conservation.

Projects 
The following list is a selection of Kellner's projects:

 1930: Buildings of the Allgemeinen Ortskrankenkasse, Erfurt
 1935: Residence of Dr Ullrich, Gotha
 1936–1938: Restoration of the Martin Luther memorial at St. Augustine's Monastery, Erfurt
 1945–1950; Reconstruction of St Thomas' Church, Erfurt
 1947: Reconstruction of the Freies Deutsches Hochstift and Goethe House in Frankfurt
 1950–1954: Reconstruction of the Hauptwache, Frankfurt
 1950–1954: Reconstruction of the Church of St Catherine, Frankfurt
 1959–1965: Reconstruction of the Church of St Peter, Frankfurt

References

External links 

1899 births
1969 deaths
German architects